Ray Schmautz (born January 26, 1943 in Chula Vista, California) is a former American football linebacker who played for San Diego State in college, and then with the Oakland Raiders.  He played 10 games for Oakland in the 1966 NFL season.

Ray was traded to the Denver Broncos in 1967 along with the defensive end Rich Jackson and outside guard Dick Tyson for the wide receiver Lionel Taylor and center Jerry Sturm. Schmautz retired after the 1967 season to become a Christian minister in Upland, California.He is now retired, and living in Florida.

References

1943 births
Living people
Sportspeople from Chula Vista, California
Denver Broncos players
Oakland Raiders players
San Diego State Aztecs football players
American football linebackers